Miguel Lucas Tomás (born 13 September 1937, died 6 February 2023) is professor of medical stomatology at Complutense University of Madrid. He was the founder of European Association of Oral Medicine.

References 

20th-century Spanish physicians
Living people
1937 births
21st-century Spanish physicians